Iviella is a genus of North American cribellate araneomorph spiders in the family Dictynidae, and was first described by Pekka T. Lehtinen in 1967.  it contains only three species: I. newfoundlandensis, I. ohioensis, and I. reclusa.

References

Araneomorphae genera
Dictynidae
Spiders of North America
Taxa named by Pekka T. Lehtinen